Christopher Patrick Curran  (born 6 January 1971) is an English former professional footballer who played in the Football League, as a central defender.

He played for Mossley on loan in 1991, and later played for Kitchee, Rhyl and Stand Athletic.

References

1971 births
Living people
People from Heywood, Greater Manchester
English footballers
Association football central defenders
Crewe Alexandra F.C. players
Scarborough F.C. players
Carlisle United F.C. players
Rhyl F.C. players
English Football League players
Mossley A.F.C. players